Greenpoint Historic District is a national historic district in Greenpoint, Brooklyn, New York, New York.  It consists of 363 contributing commercial and residential buildings built between 1850 and 1900.  It includes both substantial and modest row houses and numerous walk-up apartment buildings, as well as a variety of commercial buildings including the former Eberhard Faber Pencil Factory, six churches, and two banks.

It was listed on the National Register of Historic Places in 1983.

References

Italianate architecture in New York City
Victorian architecture in New York City
Greenpoint, Brooklyn
Historic districts on the National Register of Historic Places in Brooklyn
Historic districts in New York City